Nicholas Schwaderer (born 1988) was a Republican member of the Montana Legislature. He was elected to House District 14, which represents the Superior, Montana area.

Prior to serving in the House, Nicholas earned a 2:1 in Law from the University of Plymouth. He has been active in limited-government and free market activism both statewide and nationally, including a fellowship with the Institute for Humane Studies in 2011.

In 2012, Schwaderer raised a total fund of $7,070 and won the election to the Montana House of Representatives.

In the term of 2013-2015 he was active on the Montana committee assignments.

References

External links
Home page
2012 election results

Living people
1988 births
Alumni of the University of Plymouth
Republican Party members of the Montana House of Representatives
Republican Party Montana state senators
People from Mineral County, Montana